Hideo Tokoro (born August 22, 1977) is a Japanese mixed martial artist who last competed in the Bantamweight division. A professional competitor since 2000, Tokoro has also formerly competed for Vale Tudo Japan, ZST, Shooto, Rings and K-1 Hero's. He is notable for holding the record for most weight divisions competed in by a professional MMA fighter, at seven, ranging from flyweight through to heavyweight.

Mixed martial arts career
Tokoro got his first contact with mixed martial arts in 1999, joining Kenichi Yamamoto's Power of Dream gym. He debuted in Titan Fighting Championship in 2000 and moved to multiple promotions, among them Fighting Network Rings, Shooto, ZST and K-1, the latter of which signed him up for its Hero's MMA promotion. Up to that point, as fighting wasn't enough to make a living, Tokoro had worked part-time as a janitor, an aspect which K-1 promoted heavily in order to show him as a humble, hard-working underdog figure.

Hero's
Tokoro had his debut in Hero's in 2005 in the Lightweight Grand Prix Quarterfinal. He went against the well regarded Alexandre Franca Nogueira, and shocked pundits by knocking him out with a spinning backfist at the end of a fast-paced, back and forth match. Tokoro advanced round against Shooto veteran Caol Uno, but he was controlled and damaged for a unanimous decision loss.

On December 31, 2005, Tokoro faced Royce Gracie from the Gracie family at the K-1 Premium Dynamite!!! event in a much publicized match. The bout had special stipulations, as Royce had demanded no judge decision and 10-minute rounds, and was fought at openweight, with the Brazilian outweighing Tokoro by 40 lbs. Still, Hideo gave an excellent performance, controlling the stand-up and forcing Gracie to play conservatively on his own field of strength.

Immediately landing a punch combo and a high kick, the Japanese passed the first round in Gracie's guard, slamming him several times and bloodying his opponent's face with ground and pound, while Gracie kept himself active with heel kicks and short hammerfists. At the second, Tokoro fell in bad position upon trying a spinning kick, becoming entangled in a series of reversals both in the clinch and on the ground and being forced to defend a rear naked choke, but he ended the match again attacking Royce's guard. The match ended in a draw as stipulated, but Tokoro was seen by many as a moral victor, which boosted his popularity.

At K-1 Premium Dynamite!!! 2006, Tokoro faced another member of the Gracie family, this time Royce's brother, Royler, more similar to Tokoro in size and under regular rules. The Brazilian was successful in taking the fight to the mat, but Tokoro counterattacked from the bottom with unceasing submission attempts. Returning to their feet, Gracie tried to clinch, but Hideo landed a heavy jumping knee and knocked Royler down with punches. The Japanese would be momentarily thwarted after failing a flying Kimura lock attempt, but he swept Gracie and controlled him for the rest of the match, winning a unanimous decision.

Tokoro also participated in Dynamite!! USA in 2007, submitting Brad Pickett by armbar.

Also in 2007, Tokoro faced Rings legend Kiyoshi Tamura at the Dynamite!!! event. The heavier Tamura capitalized on his striking and wrestling advantage to control the bout, which forced Tokoro to absorb punishment and use every opportunity to scramble to try to get his game. At the third round, Tamura tried a Kimura lock, and although he couldn't twist the arm, he stretched it. Tokoro refused to tap out, but the match was eventually called off by submission.

Dream
Tokoro competed in Dream's Featherweight Grand Prix where he lost in the first round to Daiki Hata, but was brought back into the tournament and defeated Abel Cullum in the second round, before losing to Hiroyuki Takaya in the semi-finals.

Tokoro faced Antonio Banuelos in the opening Bantamweight Grand Prix round at Dream 17 at Saitami Super Arena in Saitama, Japan, on Sept. 24.  He lost the fight via split decision.

Tokoro lost to Yusup Saadulaev in a tournament reserve bout on December 31, 2011, at Fight For Japan: Genki Desu Ka Omisoka 2011 via KO (slam) in the first round.

Vale Tudo Japan
Tokoro faced Rumina Sato at Vale Tudo Japan 2012 on December 24, 2012. Tokoro defeated Sato by TKO in the first round.

He then faced Taylor McCorriston at Vale Tudo Japan: VTJ 2nd on June 22, 2013. Tokoro won the fight via heel hook submission.

In his latest fight, Tokoro faced UFC veteran Will Campuzano at Vale Tudo Japan: VTJ 3rd on October 5, 2013. He lost the fight via split decision.

Other promotions
Fighting outside of Vale Tudo Japan, Tokoro faced Victor Henry at Grandslam MMA: Way of the Cage on July 13, 2014. He lost the fight via second-round TKO.

Bellator MMA
Tokoro made his Bellator debut against LC Davis on March 27, 2015 at Bellator 135. He lost the back-and-forth fight via split decision.

Rizin Fighting Federation
In his debut for the Rizin Fighting Federation, Tokoro faced Kizaemon Siaga on December 29, 2015.  He won the fight via submission due to an arm bar in the first round.

In his second fight for the promotion, Tokoro faced Kron Gracie on September 25, 2016 at Rizin World Grand-Prix 2016: First Round. He lost the fight via submission in the first round.

In his third fight for the promotion, Tokoro faced Asen Yamamoto on December 31, 2016 at Rizin World Grand-Prix 2016: Final Round. He won the fight via submission in the first round.

In his next fight for Rizin, Tokoro faced Kyoji Horiguchi in the first round of the Rizin Bantamweight Grand Prix on July 30, 2017 at Rizin 6. He lost the fight via knockout in the first round.

Tokoro returned to MMA, after a three year hiatus, to fight the Olympic wrestling silver medalist Shinobu Ota at Rizin 26. He won the fight by submission, snatching an armbar midway through the second round.

Tokoro faced Makoto Takahashi at Rizin 37 - Saitama on July 31, 2022, following a two-year absence from the sport. He lost the fight by unanimous decision.

Tokoro faced John Dodson on December 31, 2022 at Rizin 40. He lost the bout by knockout in the first round via punches.

Fighting style
Tokoro uses a style described as "breakneck paced" and "exciting." A skilled grappler, he works at high-speed on the ground and takes all risks with bold submission attempts, often leaving himself open to counterattacks in order to seek a chance to win. He favors shoot wrestling-inspired entries and leglocks, but is known for his brilliant positional work too. Despite this, he is also dangerous on his feet, counting on fast punches and jumping knees, as well as unorthodox attacks like spinning backfists and even spinning heel kicks.

Championships and accomplishments
Dream
2011 Dream Japanese Bantamweight Grand Prix Champion 
2009 Dream Featherweight Grand Prix Semifinalist 
Yahoo! Sports
2015 Best Fight of the Half-Year vs. LC Davis

Mixed martial arts record

|-
|Loss
|align=center| 35–32–2
|John Dodson
|KO (punches)
|Rizin 40
|
|align=center| 1
|align=center| 1:43
|Saitama, Japan
|
|-
|Loss
|align=center|35–31–2
|Makoto Takahashi
|Decision (unanimous)
|Rizin 37
|
|align=center|3
|align=center|5:00
|Saitama, Japan
|
|-
|Win
|align=center|35–30–2
|Shinobu Ota
|Submission (armbar)
|Rizin 26
|
|align=center|2
|align=center|2:23
|Saitama, Japan
|
|-
|Loss
|align=center| 34–30–2
|Kyoji Horiguchi
|KO (punches)
|Rizin World Grand Prix 2017 Opening Round - Part 1
|
|align=center|1
|align=center|1:49
|Saitama, Japan
|2017 Rizin Bantamweight Grand Prix First Round
|-
|Win
|align=center| 34–29–2
|Asen Yamamoto
|Submission (armbar)
| Rizin World Grand-Prix 2016: Final Round
|
|align=center| 1
|align=center| 1:19
| Saitama, Japan
|
|-
|Loss
|align=center| 33-29-2
|Kron Gracie
|Submission (rear-naked choke)
| Rizin World Grand-Prix 2016: First Round
|
|align=center| 1
|align=center| 9:45
| Saitama, Japan
|
|-
| Win
| align=center| 33–28–2
| Kizaemon Siaga
| Submission (armbar)
|  Rizin World Grand Prix 2015: Part 1 - Saraba 
| 
| align=center| 1
| align=center| 5:15
| Saitama, Japan
| 
|-
|Loss
|align=center|32–28–2
|LC Davis
|Decision (split)
|Bellator 135
|
|align=center| 3
|align=center| 5:00
|Thackerville, Oklahoma
|
|-
| Loss
| align=center| 32–27–2
| Victor Henry
| TKO (punches)
| Grandslam MMA: Way of the Cage
| 
|align=center| 2
|align=center| 1:52
| Tokyo, Japan
|
|-
| Loss
| align=center| 32–26–2
| Will Campuzano
| Decision (split)
| Vale Tudo Japan: VTJ 3rd
| 
| align=center| 3
| align=center| 5:00
| Tokyo, Japan
| 
|-
| Win
| align=center| 32–25–2
| Taylor McCorriston
| Submission (heel hook)
| Vale Tudo Japan: VTJ 2nd
| 
| align=center| 2
| align=center| 2:34
| Tokyo, Japan
|
|-
| Win
| align=center| 31–25–2
| Rumina Sato
| TKO (punches & elbows)
| Vale Tudo Japan: VTJ 1st
| 
| align=center| 1
| align=center| 0:39
| Tokyo, Japan
| 
|-
| Loss
| align=center| 30–25–2
| Yusup Saadulaev
| KO (slam)
| Dream: Fight for Japan
| 
| align=center| 1
| align=center| 0:42
| Saitama, Japan
| Dream Bantamweight Tournament reserve bout
|-
| Loss
| align=center| 30–24–2
| Antonio Banuelos
| Decision (split)
| Dream 17
| 
| align=center| 3
| align=center| 5:00
| Saitama, Japan
| Dream Bantamweight Tournament Quarterfinal
|-
| Win
| align=center| 30–23–2
| Masakazu Imanari
| Decision (unanimous)
| Dream: Japan GP Final
| 
| align=center| 2
| align=center| 5:00
| Tokyo, Japan
| Dream Bantamweight Grand Prix Final
|-
| Win
| align=center| 29–23–2
| Atsushi Yamamoto
| Decision (split)
| Dream: Fight for Japan!
| 
| align=center| 2
| align=center| 5:00
| Saitama, Japan
| Dream Bantamweight Grand Prix Semifinal
|-
| Win
| align=center| 28–23–2
| Yoshiro Maeda
| TKO (corner stoppage)
| Dream: Fight for Japan!
| 
| align=center| 2
| align=center| 0:43
| Saitama, Japan
| Dream Bantamweight Grand Prix Quarterfinal. Return to Bantamweight.
|-
| Win
| align=center| 27–23–2
| Kazuhisa Watanabe
| Submission (armbar)
| Dynamite!! 2010
| 
| align=center| 3
| align=center| 2:50
| Saitama, Japan
| 
|-
| Loss
| align=center| 26–23–2
| Joachim Hansen
| Submission (triangle choke)
| Dream 16
| 
| align=center| 1
| align=center| 2:48
| Nagoya, Japan
| 
|-
| Loss
| align=center| 26–22–2
| Akiyo Nishiura
| TKO (punches)
| Dream 14
| 
| align=center| 1
| align=center| 2:51
| Saitama, Japan
| 
|-
| Win
| align=center| 26–21–2
| Kim Jong-Man
| Decision (unanimous)
| Dynamite!! The Power of Courage 2009
| 
| align=center| 3
| align=center| 5:00
| Saitama, Japan
| 
|-
| Loss
| align=center| 25–21–2
| Hiroyuki Takaya
| TKO (punches)
| Dream 11
| 
| align=center| 2
| align=center| 0:32
| Yokohama, Japan
| Dream Featherweight Grand Prix Semifinal
|-
| Win
| align=center| 25–20–2
| Abel Cullum
| Submission (rear-naked choke)
| Dream 9
| 
| align=center| 2
| align=center| 1:38
| Yokohama, Japan
| Dream Featherweight Grand Prix Quarterfinal.
|-
| Loss
| align=center| 24–20–2
| Daiki Hata
| Decision (unanimous)
| Dream 8
| 
| align=center| 2
| align=center| 5:00
| Nagoya, Japan
| Dream Featherweight Grand Prix Opening Round
|-
| Loss
| align=center| 24–19–2
| Daisuke Nakamura
| Submission (armbar)
| Fields Dynamite!! 2008
| 
| align=center| 1
| align=center| 2:23
| Saitama, Japan
| 
|-
| Loss
| align=center| 24–18–2
| Atsushi Yamamoto
| Decision (unanimous)
| Dream 6: Middleweight Grand Prix 2008 Final Round
| 
| align=center| 2
| align=center| 5:00
| Saitama, Japan
| 
|-
| Win
| align=center| 24–17–2
| Takeshi Yamazaki
| Decision (unanimous)
| Dream 5: Lightweight Grand Prix 2008 Final Round
| 
| align=center| 2
| align=center| 5:00
| Osaka, Japan
| 
|-
| Win
| align=center| 23–17–2
| Darren Uyenoyama
| Decision (unanimous)
| Dream 4: Middleweight Grand Prix 2008 Second Round
| 
| align=center| 2
| align=center| 5:00
| Yokohama, Japan
| 
|-
| Loss
| align=center| 22–17–2
| Kiyoshi Tamura
| Submission (straight armbar)
| K-1 Premium 2007 Dynamite!!
| 
| align=center| 3
| align=center| 3:08
| Osaka, Japan
| 
|-
| Win
| align=center| 22–16–2
| Wataru Inatsu
| Submission (armbar)
| Zst 15: Fifth Anniversary
| 
| align=center| 1
| align=center| 1:35
| Tokyo, Japan
| 
|-
| Loss
| align=center| 21–16–2
| Kultar Gill
| TKO (punches)
| Hero's 9
| 
| align=center| 1
| align=center| 4:47
| Yokohama, Japan
| Hero's 2007 Lightweight Grand Prix Quarterfinal
|-
| Win
| align=center| 21–15–2
| Brad Pickett
| Submission (armbar)
| Dynamite!! USA
| 
| align=center| 1
| align=center| 2:41
| Los Angeles, California
| 
|-
| Win
| align=center| 20–15–2
| Kazuya Yasuhiro
| Submission (armbar)
| Hero's 8
| 
| align=center| 1
| align=center| 3:00
| Nagoya, Japan
| 
|-
| Win
| align=center| 19–15–2
| Royler Gracie
| Decision (unanimous)
| K-1: Premium 2006 Dynamite!!
| 
| align=center| 3
| align=center| 5:00
| Osaka, Japan
| 
|-
| Win
| align=center| 18–15–2
| Ken Kaneko
| Submission (armbar)
| Hero's 7
| 
| align=center| 1
| align=center| 1:50
| Tokyo, Japan
| 
|-
| Loss
| align=center| 17–15–2
| Ivan Menjivar
| Decision (majority)
| Hero's 6
| 
| align=center| 2
| align=center| 5:00
| Tokyo, Japan
| Hero's 2006 Lightweight Grand Prix Quarterfinal
|-
| Loss
| align=center| 17–14–2
| Kultar Gill
| KO (knee)
| Hero's 5
| 
| align=center| 1
| align=center| 0:43
| Tokyo, Japan
| Hero's 2006 Lightweight Grand Prix Opening Round.
|-
| Win
| align=center| 17–13–2
| Yoshinori Ikeda
| Submission (triangle choke)
| Hero's 4
| 
| align=center| 1
| align=center| 0:49
| Tokyo, Japan
| 
|-
| Loss
| align=center| 16–13–2
| Erikas Petraitis
| KO (knee)
| Zst 9
| 
| align=center| 2
| align=center| 4:03
| Tokyo, Japan
| 
|-
| Draw
| align=center| 16–12–2
| Royce Gracie
| Draw
| K-1: Premium 2005 Dynamite!!
| 
| align=center| 2
| align=center| 10:00
| Osaka, Japan
| 
|-
| Win
| align=center| 16–12–1
| Gabe Lemley
| Submission (triangle choke)
| K-1 World MAX 2005 Champions Challenge
| 
| align=center| 1
| align=center| 1:12
| Tokyo, Japan
| 
|-
| Loss
| align=center| 15–12–1
| Caol Uno
| Decision (unanimous)
| Hero's 3
| 
| align=center| 2
| align=center| 5:00
| Tokyo, Japan
| Hero's 2005 Lightweight Grand Prix Quarterfinal
|-
| Win
| align=center| 15–11–1
| Alexandre Franca Nogueira
| KO (spinning back fist)
| Hero's 2
| 
| align=center| 3
| align=center| 0:08
| Tokyo, Japan
| 
|-
| Win
| align=center| 14–11–1
| Erikas Petraitis
| Decision
| Shooto Lithuania: Chaosas
| 
| align=center| N/A
| align=center| N/A
| Vilnius, Lithuania
| 
|-
| Loss
| align=center| 13-11–1
| Masahiro Oishi
| Decision (split)
| Zst: Grand Prix 2 Final Round
| 
| align=center| 3
| align=center| 3:00
| Tokyo, Japan
| 
|-
| Loss
| align=center| 13–10–1
| Darius Skliaudys
| Decision
| Shooto Lithuania: Bushido
| 
| align=center| 2
| align=center| 5:00
| Vilnius, Lithuania
| 
|-
| Win
| align=center| 13–9–1
| Shuichiro Katsumura
| Submission (guillotine choke)
| Zst: Grand Prix 2 Opening Round
| 
| align=center| 1
| align=center| 0:38
| Tokyo, Japan
| 
|-
| Loss
| align=center| 12–9–1
| Naoyuki Kotani
| Submission (heel hook)
| Zst 6
| 
| align=center| 1
| align=center| 1:44
| Tokyo, Japan
| 
|-
| Win
| align=center| 12–8–1
| Shinya Sato
| Submission (triangle choke)
| Zst: Battle Hazard 1
| 
| align=center| 1
| align=center| 3:23
| Tokyo, Japan
| 
|-
| Win
| align=center| 11–8–1
| Remigijus Morkevicius
| Submission (triangle choke)
| Zst 5
| 
| align=center| 1
| align=center| 3:30
| Tokyo, Japan
| 
|-
| Win
| align=center| 10–8–1
| Erikas Petraitis
| Submission (rear-naked choke)
| Shooto Lithuania: Vendetta
| 
| align=center| 2
| align=center| 3:40
| Vilnius, Lithuania
| 
|-
| Loss
| align=center| 9–8–1
| Tomomi Iwama
| TKO (head kicks)
| Zst: Grand Prix Final Round
| 
| align=center| 1
| align=center| 0:53
| Tokyo, Japan
| 
|-
| Win
| align=center| 9–7–1
| Masahiro Oishi
| Submission (armbar)
| Zst: Grand Prix Opening Round
| 
| align=center| 1
| align=center| 3:13
| Tokyo, Japan
| 
|-
| Win
| align=center| 8–7–1
| Taiyo Nakahara
| Submission (armbar)
| Zst: The Battlefield 4
| 
| align=center| 1
| align=center| 4:56
| Tokyo, Japan
| 
|-
| Loss
| align=center| 7–7–1
| Remigijus Morkevicius
| KO (knees)
| Zst: The Battlefield 3
| 
| align=center| 1
| align=center| 2:54
| Tokyo, Japan
| 
|-
| Loss
| align=center| 7–6–1
| Antanas Jazbutis
| Decision (1–0 points)
| Rings Lithuania: Bushido Rings 7: Adrenalinas
| 
| align=center| 2
| align=center| 5:00
| Vilnius, Lithuania
| 
|-
| Win
| align=center| 7–5–1
| Hidehiko Matsumoto
| Decision (split)
| Zst: The Battlefield 2
| 
| align=center| 2
| align=center| 5:00
| Tokyo, Japan
| 
|-
| Win
| align=center| 6–5–1
| Atsuhiro Tsuboi
| Submission (armbar)
| Zst: The Battlefield 1
| 
| align=center| 2
| align=center| 4:09
| Tokyo, Japan
| 
|-
| Win
| align=center| 5–5–1
| Masaya Takita
| TKO (cut)
| GCM: Demolition 02/09/08
| 
| align=center| 1
| align=center| 1:41
| Japan
| 
|-
| Win
| align=center| 4–5–1
| Takumi Yano
| Decision (unanimous)
| Premium Challenge
| 
| align=center| 1
| align=center| 10:00
| Tokyo, Japan
| 
|-
| Draw
| align=center| 3-5–1
| Miki Shida
| Draw (time limit)
| Pancrase: Spirit 2
| 
| align=center| 2
| align=center| 5:00
| Osaka, Japan
|
|-
| Loss
| align=center| 3–5
| Naoyuki Kotani
| Decision (majority)
| Rings: Battle Genesis Vol. 8
| 
| align=center| 3
| align=center| 5:00
| Tokyo, Japan
| 
|-
| Loss
| align=center| 3–4
| Takayuki Yamamoto
| TKO
| Titan Fighting Championship 4
| 
| align=center| 1
| align=center| 3:50
| Tokyo, Japan
| 
|-
| Win
| align=center| 3–3
| Akira Nitagai
| Submission (heel hook)
| Titan Fighting Championship 4
| 
| align=center| 1
| align=center| 5:12
| Tokyo, Japan
| 
|-
| Win
| align=center| 2–3
| Sumio Koyano
| TKO
| Titan Fighting Championship 4
| 
| align=center| 1
| align=center| 0:56
| Tokyo, Japan
| 
|-
| Loss
| align=center| 1–3
| Masashi Suzuki
| TKO (punches)
| Titan Fighting Championship 3
| 
| align=center| 1
| align=center| 1:57
| Tokyo, Japan
| 
|-
| Loss
| align=center| 1–2
| Yuji Hisamatsu
| TKO (punches)
| Titan Fighting Championship 2
| 
| align=center| 1
| align=center| 0:56
| Tokyo, Japan
| 
|-
| Win
| align=center| 1–1
| Wataru Yoshikawa
| Submission (armbar)
| Titan Fighting Championship 2
| 
| align=center| 1
| align=center| 2:19
| Tokyo, Japan
| 
|-
| Loss
| align=center| 0–1
| Naoto Ichikawa
| Submission (rear-naked choke)
| Titan Fighting Championship 1
| 
| align=center| 2
| align=center| 3:59
| Tokyo, Japan
|

Submission grappling record 
KO PUNCHES
|- style="text-align:center; background:#f0f0f0;"
| style="border-style:none none solid solid; "|Result
| style="border-style:none none solid solid; "|Opponent
| style="border-style:none none solid solid; "|Method
| style="border-style:none none solid solid; "|Event
| style="border-style:none none solid solid; "|Date
| style="border-style:none none solid solid; "|Round
| style="border-style:none none solid solid; "|Time
| style="border-style:none none solid solid; "|Notes
|-
|Loss|| Ikuhisa Minowa || Submission (ankle hold) || Quintet Fight Night 4 || November 30, 2019 || 1 ||  ||
|-
|Loss|| Shutaro Debana || Submission (sode guruma jime) || Quintet Fight Night 2 || February 3, 2019 || 1|| ||
|-
|Loss|| Dan Strauss || Submission (guillotine choke) || Quintet || April 11, 2018|| 1|| ||
|-
|Loss|| Dong Sik Yoon || Submission (sode guruma jime) || Quintet || April 11, 2018|| 1|| ||
|-
|Win|| Hyun Jun Kim || Submission (armbar) || Quintet || April 11, 2018|| 1|| ||
|-
|Draw|| Wanderlei Silva and  Kiyoshi Tamura || Draw || Rizin FF 1|| 2016|| 1|| 15:00||Partnered with  Kazushi Sakuraba
|-

References

External links
Official Fight Team

Living people
Japanese male mixed martial artists
Featherweight mixed martial artists
Bantamweight mixed martial artists
Mixed martial artists utilizing kickboxing
Mixed martial artists utilizing shoot wrestling
People from Gifu
1977 births
Japanese male kickboxers